Mazdabad may refer to:
 Mazdabad, Isfahan
 Mazdabad, Razavi Khorasan